Anna Luxová (born 28 May 1997) is a Czech Paralympic athlete. She has represented Czech Republic at the Paralympics on three occasions in 2012, 2016 and 2020.

Career 

Anna made her Paralympic debut representing Czech Republic at the 2012 Summer Paralympics at the age of 15 and competed in both women's 100m T35 and women's 200m T35.

In addition to competing in sprint events, she began training and competing in shot put events due to the uncertainties emerged over her sprinting career after undergoing Achilles tendon surgery at the age of 17. Despite the uncertainties, she took part in women's 100m T35 and women's 200m T35 events at the 2016 Summer Paralympics.

She also represented Czech Republic at the 2020 Summer Paralympics and competed in both women's shot put and women's 100m T35 events.

References 

1997 births
Living people
Czech female sprinters
Athletes (track and field) at the 2012 Summer Paralympics
Athletes (track and field) at the 2016 Summer Paralympics
Athletes (track and field) at the 2020 Summer Paralympics
Medalists at the 2020 Summer Paralympics
Paralympic bronze medalists for the Czech Republic
Cerebral Palsy category Paralympic competitors
Medalists at the World Para Athletics European Championships
Paralympic athletes of the Czech Republic
Sportspeople from Písek
Czech female shot putters